The 2013–14 Middle Tennessee Blue Raiders men's basketball team represented Middle Tennessee State University during the 2013–14 NCAA Division I men's basketball season. The Blue Raiders, led by 12th year head coach Kermit Davis, played their home games at the Murphy Center and were first year members of Conference USA. They finished the season 24–9, 13–3 in C-USA play to finish in a four way tie for the C-USA regular season championship. They advanced to the semifinals of the C-USA tournament where they lost to Tulsa. Despite their 24 wins and conference title, they did not participate in a post season tournament.

Roster

Schedule

|-
!colspan=9 style="background:#00407A; color:#FFFFFF;"| Exhibition

|-
!colspan=9 style="background:#00407A; color:#FFFFFF;"| Regular season

|-
!colspan=9 style="background:#00407A; color:#FFFFFF;"| Conference USA tournament

References

Middle Tennessee Blue Raiders men's basketball seasons
Middle Tennessee
Middle Tennessee Blue Raiders
Middle Tennessee Blue Raiders